The 2014–15 Nemzeti Bajnokság I/A is the 78th season of the Nemzeti Bajnokság I/A, the highest tier professional basketball league in Hungary.

Team information 
The following 10 clubs compete in the NB I/A during the 2013–14 season:

Regular season

Standings

Results

Playoffs
Teams in bold won the playoff series. Numbers to the left of each team indicate the team's original playoff seeding. Numbers to the right indicate the score of each playoff game.

Team roster
 Kayla McBride 
Orsolya Zsovár 
Zsófia Simon 
Tijana Krivačević 
Sara Krnjić
Zsófia Licskai
 Iva Ciglar
Patrícia Bakó 
Fanni Kocsis
Enikő Kuttor
Virág Weninger
 Dragana Stanković
 Aleksandra Crvendakić
 Kimberleyanne Gaucher
 Bria Hartley

Head coach: László Sterbenz

5th – 8th placement 
Teams in bold won the playoff series. Numbers to the left of each team indicate the team's original playoff seeding. Numbers to the right indicate the score of each playoff game.

Play-out
9th placed team hosted Games 1 and, plus Game 3 if necessary. 10th placed team hosted Game 2.

Number of teams by counties

External links
 Hungarian Basketball Federaration 

Nemzeti Bajnokság I/A (women's basketball) seasons
Women
Hungarian